Bastl is a surname. Notable people with the surname include:

George Bastl (born 1975), Swiss tennis player
Vjekoslav Bastl (1872–1947), Croatian architect

Surnames from given names